The Sarnia Sting are a junior ice hockey team based in Sarnia, Ontario, Canada. They are one of the 20 teams that make up the Ontario Hockey League. They play out of the Progressive Auto Sales Arena (formerly the Sarnia Sports and Entertainment Centre).

On January 22, 2015, NHL forward David Legwand, who played for the Ottawa Senators at the time, and former NHL defenseman Derian Hatcher entered an agreement to purchase the Sarnia Sting.  The transfer of ownership was approved by the OHL Board of Governors and completed on March 4, 2015.

History
The franchise was granted in 1969 as one of the inaugural teams of the Quebec Major Junior Hockey League. At the time, the team was located in Cornwall, Ontario and known as the Cornwall Royals. During the team's tenure in the QMJHL the Royals won the Memorial Cup in 1972, 1980, and in 1981.

For the 1981–82 season, the team transferred to the Ontario Hockey League. In 1992, the franchise moved again to Newmarket, Ontario to play as the Newmarket Royals.

In 1994, the team was bought by the Ciccarelli brothers and moved to Sarnia, Ontario. Robert Ciccarelli, voted OHL Executive of the Year in 1999–2000, was the team's president and governor until January 2015, when the team was sold to its current owners, former NHL defenseman Derian Hatcher and former NHL forward David Legwand.

In 2018, Dan Carcillo made accusations of hazing during the 2002–03 OHL season. League commissioner David Branch responded with sanctions against the Sting. The club implemented changes in its routines to avoid further incidents.
In the 2021 OHL Draft, the Sting became the first OHL team to draft a female player, selecting goalie Taya Currie 267th overall.

Championships
The Sarnia Sting are in quest of their first J. Ross Robertson Cup and first Memorial Cup. The 1996–97 season was the closest the team came to the OHL Championship, but lost in the quarter-finals to Kitchener Rangers 4 games to 3. The lone title so far came in the 2003–04 season, when the team won the OHL West Division, winning the Bumbacco Trophy, but were later eliminated in the first round of the playoffs. The Sarnia Sting won their second West Division title in 2016. They beat the Guelph Storm 7–1 to clinch the division. That was their first division title in 12 years. On March 19, 2016, the Sarnia Sting broke a franchise record from 2002–03 capturing 41 wins and 91 points to end the 2015–16 OHL season.

Coaches

Players

Award winners

Retired numbers
On January 12, 2018, the Sarnia Sting officially retired the first number in franchise history, Steven Stamkos' number 91. There are also banners in honour of Shawn Burr and Kerry Fraser. Banners that were once hung, but have since been taken down, include the ones of Aaron Brand and Peter Sarno who both won OHL scoring titles, Trevor Letowski,  who all participated at IIHF World U20 Championships in 1997, and Danny Fritsche who won gold with the United States men's national junior ice hockey team in 2004. The team is also going to be retiring Jon Sim in March 2023, the event will be announced soon.

NHL alumni

Jamie Arniel
Reid Boucher
Eric Boulton
Sean Brown
Daniel Carcillo
Jakob Chychrun
Richard Clune
Larry Courville
Mike Danton
Andy Delmore
Patrick DesRochers
Justin DiBenedetto
Jamie Fraser
Dan Fritsche
Alex Galchenyuk
Trevor Gillies
Nikolay Goldobin
Micheal Haley
Jeff Heerema
Mark Katic
Travis Konecny
Jordan Kyrou
Drew Larman
Alan Letang
Trevor Letowski
Matt Martin
Sean McMorrow
Connor Murphy
David Nemirovsky
Kris Newbury
Ivan Novoseltsev
Matt Pelech
Marek Posmyk
Dalton Prout
Adam Ruzicka
Peter Sarno
Jon Sim
Ryan Spooner
Steven Stamkos
Joey Tenute
Mike Van Ryn
Ryan Wilson
Nail Yakupov
Pavel Zacha
Jeff Zehr

Yearly results

Regular season

Legend: OT = Overtime loss, SL = Shootout loss

Playoffs
1994–95 Lost to Windsor Spitfires 4 games to 0 in division quarter-finals.
1995–96 Defeated S.S. Marie Greyhounds 4 games to 0 in division quarter-finals. Lost to Peterborough Petes 4 games to 2 in quarter-finals.
1996–97 Defeated Windsor Spitfires 4 games to 1 in division quarter-finals. Lost to Kitchener Rangers 4 games to 3 in quarter-finals.
1997–98 Lost to Plymouth Whalers 4 games to 1 in division quarter-finals.
1998–99 Lost to London Knights 4 games to 2 in conference quarter-finals.
1999–00 Lost to Windsor Spitfires 4 games to 3 in conference quarter-finals.
2000–01 Lost to Plymouth Whalers 4 games to 0 in conference quarter-finals.
2001–02 Lost to Erie Otters 4 games to 1 in conference quarter-finals.
2002–03 Lost to Guelph Storm 4 games to 2 in conference quarter-finals.
2003–04 Lost to Erie Otters 4 games to 1 in conference quarter-finals.
2004–05 DNQ
2005–06 DNQ
2006–07 Lost to Kitchener Rangers 4 games to 0 in conference quarter-finals.
2007–08 Defeated Windsor Spitfires 4 games to 1 in conference quarter-finals.Lost to Kitchener Rangers 4 games to 0 in conference semi-finals.
2008–09 Lost to Plymouth Whalers 4 games to 1 in conference quarter-finals.
2009-10 DNQ
2010-11 DNQ
2011–12 Lost to Saginaw Spirit 4 games to 2 in conference quarter-finals.
2012–13 Lost to Plymouth Whalers 4 games to 0 in conference quarter-finals.
2013-14 DNQ
2014–15 Lost to Erie Otters 4 games to 1 in conference quarter-finals.
2015–16 Lost to Sault Ste. Marie Greyhounds 4 games to 3 in conference quarter-finals.
2016–17 Lost to Erie Otters 4 games to 0 in conference quarter-finals.
2017–18 Defeated Windsor Spitfires 4 games to 2 in conference quarter-finals. Lost to Kitchener Rangers 4 games to 2 in conference semi-finals.
2018–19 Lost to Saginaw Spirit 4 games to 0 in conference quarter-finals.
2019-20 Playoffs Cancelled
2020-21 Cancelled
2021-22 Lost to Windsor Spitfires 4 games to 2 in conference quarter-finals.

Jerseys and logos

The original Sarnia Sting jersey (worn from 1994/95 - 1998/99) showed a bee playing hockey with its stinger poised. The team's colours were black, white and silver. An alternate jersey (worn from 1997/98 - 1998/99) had a yellow background and a bee holding a stick about the Sarnia name on the chest.

The current jerseys include a white jersey with a bee in the centre and a black jersey with a bee in the centre. The team got new jerseys during the 2019-20 season. During the first half of the season, the team wears the white uniform at home while during the second half of the season they wear the black uniform at home.

During the 2012 offseason the team held a contest to design the team's alternate jersey for the season. The  is yellow with black and white stripes down the arm. The logo is round and includes a picture of the Blue Water Bridge in the background with a bee in the centre. Around the bridges and the bee it is inscribed "Sarnia Sting" on top and "Hockey Club" on the bottom.

Arenas
Relocation from Newmarket, Ontario in 1994 was made on the promise that a new arena would be built in Sarnia. In the meantime the team played their first four seasons at Sarnia Arena located in the downtown area.
Sarnia Arena - The OHL Arena & Travel Guide

In 1998–99 the Sting played their first season at their new home, The Sarnia Sports and Entertainment Centre (now known as the Progressive Auto Sales Arena). It's a more modern facility with private boxes and many other amenities. The new building also hosted the Ontario Hockey League All Star Game in 1999, and the RE/Max Canada-Russia Challenge in 2004.
RBC Centre - The OHL Arena & Travel Guide

See also
List of ice hockey teams in Ontario

References

External links
 

Ontario Hockey League teams
Ice hockey clubs established in 1994
Sport in Sarnia
1994 establishments in Ontario